John J. Wood (born January 29, 1964) is the Founder of two global education charities: Room to Read and U-Go.  Wood started Room to Read in 2000 after quitting his executive position as Microsoft's Director of Business Development for the Greater China Region.  Along with his co-founders Erin Ganju and Dinesh Shrestha, he built out a global team that has raised over $750 million in funding commitments and has brought education programs to over 26 million children in 20 low income countries.

In late 2021, he announced in the Financial Times his decision to start a new non-profit, U-Go, with the aim of helping tens of thousands of young women in low income countries to pursue higher education through targeted scholarships, life skills training and job placement.  U-Go launched via a live Bloomberg interview on February 7, 2021 and is now working in Bangladesh, Cambodia, India, Indonesia, Pakistan and Vietnam with plans to add on Nepal and the Philippines.

At the invitation of former President Bill Clinton, Wood served four terms on the Advisory Board of the Clinton Global Initiative and was a frequent speaker at their annual event.  He currently serves on the Boards of the Singapore-based private equity firm Asia Partners and Hong Kong-based plant-based protein innovator Green Monday Holdings.  He is also on the Advisory Boards of Global Citizen Year and New Story.

Early life
John Wood was born in January 1964, in Hartford, Connecticut, where he spent his early childhood. His family later settled in Athens, Pennsylvania, where he attended high school. He holds a bachelor's degree from the University of Colorado, and a master's degree in business administration from the Kellogg Graduate School of Management at Northwestern University.   He has received honorary PhD's from McGill University, the University of San Francisco, Westminster University, and Wofford College.

From 1991-1999, Wood worked as an executive for Microsoft.  His positions included Director of Marketing for Australia, Director of Marketing for the Asia-Pacific region and Director of Business Development for Greater China.

Leaving Microsoft to Change the World
Wood took a vacation from his work at Microsoft in 1998 to trek through the Himalayas. While trekking, he met a "resource director" for the schools in the Annapurna Circuit of Nepal, with whom he visited a primary school with over 300 students but only a handful of books—none of which were age-appropriate.  Upon seeing Wood's reaction to the lack of books, the school’s headmaster suggested, "Perhaps, sir, you will someday come back with books," which inspired Wood to solicit book donations from family and friends via an appeal email sent from an Internet cafe in Kathmandu.

A year later, Wood returned to the school with 3,000 books on the back of six donkeys—all donated in response to his email appeal to friends and family. Soon thereafter, he left his job at Microsoft entirely to devote himself full-time to Books for Nepal, a side project that would eventually form the foundation for Room to Read.

Leaving Microsoft was launched in North America by HarperCollins in August 2006, and was subsequently published in 21 languages.  It was featured on The Oprah Winfrey Show in 2007, with "Oprah's Book Drive" for Room to Read raising over $3 million.    The memoir was selected by the American Booksellers Association for its BookSense Notable Books List.   It was also named one of the Top Ten non-fiction books of 2006 by Hudson's Booksellers and a Top Ten business narrative of 2006 by Amazon.com.   The sequel—titled Creating Room to Read:  A Story of Hope in the Battle for Global Literacy was published by Penguin in February, 2013.

Room to Read
Wood co-founded Room to Read in 2001 with Dinesh Shrestha and Erin Ganju. Operating in 20 low-income countries, the organization focuses on increasing literacy and gender equality in education. Its programs develop literacy skills and a habit of reading among primary school children, and support girls to complete secondary school with the relevant life skills to succeed in school and beyond.  Over 25 million children have benefitted from the organization's programs.

U-Go 
Wood launched U-Go after meeting many Room to Read Girl Scholars whose parents were grateful that their daughters would finish secondary school, but frustrated that they would not be able to continue on to university.  For many years he and a small group of friends had personally bankrolled a few dozen scholarships, but he felt this was "too little and too random" and that a more strategic and scalable model was needed to "hand out sledgehammers to shatter this remaining glass ceiling".  U-Go's Founding Board is composed of business leaders in five countries and includes Tim Caflisch, Benjamin (Ben) Happ, Patricia Horgan, Nick Nash, Archana Parekh, Anne Patricia Sutanto and Mariana Zobel de Ayala.

Zak the Yak with Books on his Back
Wood authored his first children's book, Zak the Yak with Books on His Back, in 2010. The book, written in rhyme and illustrated by Nepali artist Abin Shrestha, tells the story of Room to Read in a manner accessible to school children.  Wood has said that with the book he aims to inspire children to take action. Self-published by Room to Read with costs underwritten by The Republic of Tea, all revenue from Zak the Yak goes directly to the organization's programs.

Television and Radio

Wood appears frequently on television and radio, with multiple appearances on the Australian Broadcasting Corporation, BBC, Bloomberg, CNBC's Squawk Box, Channel News Asia, CNN, CNN Headline News, MSNBC, PBS and Tavis Smiley.    He has also been profiled or interviewed on Charlie Rose, CBS Evening News, CTV (Canada), France24, Globo (Brazil), the Katie Couric Show, KQED, the Oprah Winfrey Show, Radio France International, WAMU (Kojo Nnamdi) WNYC (Leonard Lopate Show) and numerous others.

Published works
 'Hong Kong Helps Nepal - A Report from the Quake Zone" - South China Morning Post, July 2015, series of four daily posts from the field.
 Creating Room to Read: A Story of Hope in the Battle for Global Literacy (Viking Penguin, 2013)
It Began with Books—Newsweek, 2008
 Leaving Microsoft to Change the World: An Entrepreneur's Odyssey to Educate the World's Children. (HarperCollins, 2006)* 
 "You Say You Want a Revolution?", GOOD Magazine. (January 26, 2009)
 "The Ultimate Second Act," Stanford Social Innovation Review. (Summer 2009)
 Zak the Yak with Books on His Back. (Publishing cost underwritten by The Republic of Tea, 2010)
 "Memo to Billionaires--We're Ready for You." (with Matt Flannery of Kiva) CNBC.com (September 27, 2010)

Awards 
Wood has received the following honours:

 Northwestern University Alumni Association Service to Society Award, 2015
 World Children's Prize, for a "15 year fight for children's right to education", awarded by Queen Silvia of Sweden
 Goldman Sachs "100 Most Intriguing Entrepreneurs", 2013
 Tribeca Film Festival Lifetime Achievement Award for "Disruptive Innovation", 2012
 Sandor Teszler Award for Moral Courage and Service to Humankind, 2012
 Forbes Impact30 List of the top social entrepreneurs
 Barron's list of the "25 Best Givers", 2009 and 2010
 Inaugural winner of Microsoft Alumni of the Year award, presented by Bill and Melinda Gates
 2009 Asia Society Award For public service to Asia
 Three-time speaker at the Clinton Global Initiative
 Five-time winner of the Fast Company magazine and Monitor Group's Social Capitalist Award
 Recipient of Time Magazine’s "Asian Heroes" Award, recognizing "20 People under 40 who have done something brave, bold, or remarkable" (the only non-Asian ever chosen for this honor)
 Selected for the inaugural class of "Young Global Leaders" by the World Economic Forum
 Henry Crown Fellow at the Aspen Institute
 Four-time winner of the Skoll Foundation Award for Social Innovation
 Second recipient of the Draper Richards Fellowship
 Profiled by the Public Broadcasting Service (PBS) as one of "America’s Great Leaders"
 Honorary doctorate in Education from McGill University, Honorary Doctorate in Humane Letters from the University of San Francisco, with honorary PhD's also from Westminster College (2009) and Wofford College (2012).

Personal life
Wood lived with his wife Amy Powell in Hong Kong for 8 years but now resides in Solana Beach, California. He travels roughly 200 days per year for media, public speaking and fund-raising opportunities.   His hobbies include running, skiing, hiking, travel, reading, and wine.  He has run 16 marathons, traveled to over 50 countries, appeared as an extra in Law and Order and is an investor in over 25 growth companies.

References

External links 
 
 U-Go web site 
 John Wood's personal website
 

1964 births
University of Colorado alumni
Kellogg School of Management alumni
American humanitarians
American memoirists
American nonprofit executives
Living people
Henry Crown Fellows